The women's 200 metre individual medley event at the 1992 Summer Olympics took place on 30 July at the Piscines Bernat Picornell in Barcelona, Spain.

Records
Prior to this competition, the existing world and Olympic records were as follows.

The following records were established during the competition:

Results

Heats
Rule: The eight fastest swimmers advance to final A (Q), while the next eight to final B (q).

Finals

Final B

Final A

References

External links
 Official Report

Swimming at the 1992 Summer Olympics
1992 in women's swimming
Women's events at the 1992 Summer Olympics